A tlapitzalli is an aerophone known from pre-Columbian Mesoamerican cultures, particularly the Aztec. It is a form of flute, made of ceramic, wood, clay, or bone. They are most often decorated with abstract designs or images of Aztec deities. The tlapitzalli could be multi-chambered, examples using up to four chambers are known. Tlapitzalli was also a term that was used to refer to the conch shell trumpets used to coordinate attacks during Aztec war ceremonies.

The name comes from the Nahuatl language.

See also
 Music of Mexico
 Latin American music
 Aztec

References

Flutes
Aztec society
Mesoamerican musical instruments
Mexican musical instruments